The Corrigan Baronetcy, of Cappagh and Inniscorrig in the County of Dublin and of Merrion Square in the City of Dublin, was a title in the Baronetage of the United Kingdom. It was created on 5 February 1866 for the Irish physician Dominic Corrigan. The title became extinct on the early death of his grandson, the second Baronet, in 1883.

Corrigan baronets, of Cappagh, Inniscorrig and Merrion Square (1866)
Sir Dominic John Corrigan, 1st Baronet (1802–1880)
John Corrigan (died 1866)
Sir John Joseph Corrigan, 2nd Baronet (1859–1883)

Arms

References

Extinct baronetcies in the Baronetage of the United Kingdom